Clarkston High School is a public high school located in Independence Township, Michigan.  It is the only high school in the Clarkston Community Schools.

History

Clarkston High School used to be in Clarkston, Michigan. The third Clarkston School was built in 1910 on Main Street (M-15). 	

By the time the fourth Clarkston School was completed in 1930 in Independence Township, the area's population had started to decline. After World War II, Independence Township's population began to boom. In 1952, Clarkston Community Schools was formed and Clarkston and Andersonville Elementary Schools were completed, leaving the 6th-to-12th graders as sole occupants at the newly renamed Clarkston High School. Expansions were made in the mid-1950s. By the end of the decade the building could not be expanded anymore, and in 1960, the fifth Clarkston High School was built across the street (although its official address was 6595 Middle Lake Road). The 1930 building became Clarkston Junior High. 	 	

The 1960 building remained unchanged until major renovations were made in 1993 when freshmen were allowed to attend the school for the first time since 1969. Unfortunately the renovations were not enough to handle nearly 2,000 students, and in 1998 the current building was opened. The 1960 building is now the current Clarkston Junior High, and starting in 2005 freshmen returned to that building. That same year, the old Sashabaw Middle School was renovated and now holds only grades six and seven. The old Clarkston Middle School was also renovated and made into the new Clarkston Junior High School, which holds grades eight and nine.

Athletics
CHS offers 26 varsity sports, and competes in the Oakland Activities Association or "OAA".  At the state level, the school is classified as "Class A" or "Division 1" of the Michigan High School Athletic Association, competing against those schools with the largest enrollments.

The "Wolves" (or Lady Wolves) name is used by most athletic teams at the secondary education level.  The chief rival to Clarkston is the Lake Orion High School Dragons, located in Orion Township, Michigan.

Clarkston Wolves won the Division 1 Football State Championship in 2013.  Clarkston repeated as Division 1 Football State Champions the next year in 2014. The Wolves also won the 2017 MHSAA Football state championship for their third football state championship in five years. That same year the Wolves basketball team won their first Class A State Championship under head coach Dan Fife. In 2018, the Wolves repeated as State Champions with an 81-38 victory over Holland West Ottawa. The leading scorer of that game, Foster Loyer, went on the win the 2018 Hal Schram Mr. Basketball award. Dan Fife retired later that year as the third-winningest head coach in state history after 36 seasons, with a career coaching record of 703-170.

Sports offered

 Baseball
 Boys Basketball
 Girls Basketball
 Boys Lacrosse
 Boys Bowling
 Girls Bowling
 Competitive Cheer
 Competitive Dance
 Football
 Girls Field Hockey 
 Boys Golf
 Girls Golf
 Girls Lacrosse
 Boys Ice Hockey
 Softball
 Boys Skiing
 Boys Soccer
 Girls Soccer
 Boys Swimming and Diving
 Girls Swimming and Diving
 Boys Tennis
 Girls Tennis
 Boys Track and Field
 Girls Track and Field
 Volleyball
 Wrestling
 Boys Cross Country
 Girls Cross Country

Notable alumni

 Tim Birtsas, former professional baseball player
 Steve Howe, Former MLB pitcher
 Geoff Johns, comic book and television writer
 Tony Lucca, singer/actor
 Tim McCormick, former NBA player
 Tim Robinson, actor/comedian, regular on Saturday Night Live
 Daniel Travis, actor, Open Water

References

External links
Clarkston Community Schools
Clarkston High School

Public high schools in Michigan
High schools in Oakland County, Michigan
1999 establishments in Michigan